Schaumburg is a district (Landkreis) of Lower Saxony, Germany. It is bounded by (clockwise from the north) the districts of Nienburg, Hanover and Hamelin-Pyrmont, and the state of North Rhine-Westphalia (districts of Lippe and Minden-Lübbecke).

History
Landkreis Schaumburg was created on August 1, 1977 within the framework of the Kreisreform (district reform) of Lower Saxony by combining the former districts of Schaumburg-Lippe and Grafschaft Schaumburg.  The town of Hessisch Oldendorf was reallocated to Landkreis Hameln-Pyrmont.  The communities of Großenheidorn, Idensermoor-Niengraben and Steinhude had already been allocated to the community of Wunsdorf and thereby became part of Landkreis Hanover.

The Landkreis Schaumburg essentially duplicates the borders of Schaumburg at the time of the Middle Ages.  Schaumburg was a medieval county, which was founded at the beginning of the 12th century. Shortly after, the Holy Roman Emperor appointed the counts of Schaumburg to become counts of Holstein as well.

During the Thirty Years' War the House of Schaumburg had no male heir, and the county was divided into Schaumburg (which became part of Hesse-Kassel) and the County of Schaumburg-Lippe (1640). As a member of the Confederation of the Rhine, Schaumburg-Lippe raised itself to a principality. In 1815, Schaumburg-Lippe joined the German Confederation, and in 1871 the German Empire. In 1918, it became a republic. The tiny Free State of Schaumburg-Lippe existed until 1946, when it became an administrative area within Lower Saxony. Schaumburg-Lippe had an area of 340 km², and a population of 51,000 (as of 1934).

Hessian Schaumburg was annexed to Prussia along with the rest of Hesse-Kassel in 1866.  After World War II, Schaumburg and Schaumburg-Lippe became districts within the state of Lower Saxony, until they were merged again in 1977.

Geography
The district (Landkreis) of Schaumburg has its northern half located in the North German Plain and the southern half in the Weser Uplands (Weserbergland). The Weser Uplands consist of hilly ridges and include the Wesergebirge, Harrl, Süntel, Bückeberg and Deister.  The Schaumburg Forest is a continuous strip of woods running in a direction of approximately 60 degrees along the northern border of the district.  Just beyond the northern border of the district is Lake Steinhude a 29,1 km2 shallow lake that is the largest in Northern Germany.  The river Weser flows westward along the south of the Wiehengebirge through a broad valley and the town of Rinteln.  The landscape is bordered to the west by the River Weser which is in the neighbouring district of Minden-Lübbecke.  It flows north through the Westphalian Gap towards the city of Bremen and the North Sea. In the flat North German Plain to the east of Schaumburg district lies Hanover, the capital city of Lower Saxony.

Coat of arms
The coat of arms is almost identical to the old arms of Schaumburg, which had been used since the 12th century. Schaumburg Castle, in mediaeval times the seat of the Counts of Schaumburg, is located on the Nesselberg ("nettle mountain") in Schaumburg, a locality in the town of Rinteln. The nettle leaf in the middle of the arms has become the heraldic symbol of Holstein, symbolising the historical connection between Holstein and Schaumburg.

Towns and municipalities

Towns

Samtgemeinden (collective municipalities) with their member municipalities

See also
 Metropolitan region Hannover-Braunschweig-Göttingen-Wolfsburg
 Schaumburg, Illinois

References

External links

 Official website 
 Schaumburg-Lippe genealogy website 

 
1640 disestablishments
States and territories established in 1110
Districts of Lower Saxony